Albert of Jerusalem  (Albertus Hierosolymitanus; Albertus Vercelensis, also Saint Albert, Albert of Vercelli or Alberto Avogadro; died 14 September 1214) was a canon lawyer and saint. He was Bishop of Bobbio and Bishop of Vercelli, and served as mediator and diplomat under Pope Clement III. Innocent III appointed him Patriarch of Jerusalem in 1204 or 1205. In Jerusalem, he contributed the Carmelite Rule of St. Albert to the newly-founded Carmelite Order. He is honoured as a saint in the Roman Catholic Church and commemorated by the Carmelites on 17 September.

Life
Born at Castel Gualtieri, Italy, he was educated in theology and law. He entered the Canons Regular of the Holy Cross at Mortara and was elected prior in 1180.
He became Bishop of Bobbio in 1184, and a year later was appointed Bishop of Vercelli. He served the Papacy as a mediator and diplomat between Pope Clement III and Holy Roman Emperor Frederick Barbarossa. He served as papal legate in 1199 and helped end the war between Parma and Piacenza.

In 1205 he was made Patriarch of Jerusalem by Pope Innocent III, whom he also served as papal legate in the Holy Land. As patriarch, he helped found the Carmelite Order around 1209, in particular by his composition of what came to be called the Carmelite Rule of St. Albert.  This order was based on Mount Carmel, across the Bay of Haifa from Acre where he resided as patriarch.
Additionally, he mediated disputes between the Kingdom of Jerusalem and the Kingdom of Cyprus and between the Knights Templar and the Armenian Kingdom of Cilicia.

In 1214 he had been invited to the Fourth Lateran Council, but the Master of the Hospital of the Holy Spirit, whom he had rebuked and deposed for immorality, stabbed him to death on 14 September while taking part in a procession on the Feast of the Exaltation of the Holy Cross. 
He was succeeded by Raoul of Merencourt.

See also

 Book of the First Monks
 Constitutions of the Carmelite Order

References

External links
Carmelite Calendar", at Sr. Helena of Mary, O.Carm, "St. Albert of Jerusalem, Law-Giver of Carmel"
"St. Albert of Jerusalem", St. Joseph's Carmelite Monastery, Kilmacud
Catholic Online, "St. Albert of Jerusalem"
"Colonnade Statue in St Peter's Square"

1214 deaths
Bishops of Bobbio
Bishops of Vercelli
Christians of the Crusades
Latin Patriarchs of Jerusalem
Diplomats of the Holy See
Italian beatified people
Canon law jurists
Carmelite spirituality
Venerated Carmelites
13th-century Roman Catholic archbishops in the Kingdom of Jerusalem
13th-century venerated Christians
12th-century Italian jurists
13th-century Italian jurists